Kite is the breakthrough second album by Kirsty MacColl, released in 1989. Produced by her then-husband Steve Lillywhite, it was her first album for Virgin Records. The album included MacColl's hit cover of the Kinks' "Days", as well as two tracks written with Smiths guitarist Johnny Marr. On 6 October 1989 it was certified silver by the BPI.

Background
In a 1991 interview with Melody Maker, MacColl commented, "With Kite, I felt I had to prove that I wasn't this bimbo girl-next-door I'd been portrayed as. That had been hanging around my neck like a fucking albatross for so long, and I wanted to make the point that, yes, I can write a fucking song, pal! I didn't feel that I had to prove myself this time."

Critical reception

On its release, Dave Jennings of Melody Maker described the album as a "thoughtful, mature, yet sometimes exhilarating LP" and "cerebral but instantly likeable; never wild or abandoned, but always intriguing". Aside from some "tender moments", he considered most of Kite to show MacColl "on the attack", with her "carefully-layered, deadpan vocals" suiting the "anger" in her lyrics. Simon Williams of New Musical Express considered it "an old-fashioned album" with "proper songs [and] resolutely orthodox instruments". He concluded, "Kite is charming rather than classy. Everything is pleasantly down-to-earth, sweet and sour stories from a woman's point of view which always avoid being emotionally extreme." Peter Kane of Sounds noted it "boasts some fine tunes about life, love and the whole damned thing" which is "done in a peculiarly colloquial, very English style" and with "not a hint of pretension". He described the album as "one to be proud of" and one which "deserves to be heard".

In a retrospective review, AllMusic called Kite "the pinnacle of [MacColl's]  achievement" and her "best-sustained work". They felt that MacColl's songwriting was "excellent", with some of her "sharpest and cleverest words and most memorable melodies." Trouser Press wrote of the album: "This sturdy, provocative collection mixes full-bodied pop styles with some country, adding a film noir story sung in French, a pair of wonderful covers and pointed lyrical assaults on both Margaret Thatcher and shallow pop stars." The Rolling Stone Album Guide described the album as having a "skillfull, introspective elegance".

Re-issues
Kite was re-released in 2005 with ten bonus tracks, including B-sides and alternate mixes . A 2012 expanded edition released by Salvo Records features a bonus disc with seventeen bonus tracks, also with B-sides and alternate mixes. Both re-issues were remastered. Demon Records re-issued the original twelve-track album in 2018 on 180g vinyl.

Track listing
Adapted from the album's liner notes.

2012 edition bonus CD 
The first disc contains the twelve tracks from the original album.

Personnel

Musicians
Kirsty MacColl – vocals, acoustic guitar (10), electric guitar (10), bass (10), lap steel guitar (6, 7), autoharp (6), percussion (6, 10)
Guy Barker – trumpet (6, 7, 15)
Mark Berrow – violin (1, 12)
Stuart Brooks – trumpet (7, 15)
Paul Crowder – percussion (2, 9, 13-15)
Ben Cruft – violin (1, 12)
James Eller – bass (2, 3, 6, 7)
Mel Gaynor – drums (1, 4, 5, 8, 9, 11, 13-15)
Wilfred Gibson – violin (1, 7, 12)
Roy Gillard – violin (1, 7, 12)
David Gilmour – electric guitar (5), acoustic guitar (12) 
Pete Glenister – acoustic guitar (1-7, 9, 11), electric guitar (1-3, 7-9, 14, 15)
Malcolm Griffiths – trombone (6, 7, 15)
Jamie Lillywhite – vocals (1) 
Louis Lillywhite – vocals (1)
Steve Lillywhite – double bass (6)
Robbie McIntosh – acoustic guitar (2, 6, 7), electric guitar (3)
Johnny Marr – electric guitar (3-5, 8, 9, 11-13), acoustic guitar (4, 9), harmonica (15)
Yves N'Djock – electric guitar (1, 14, 15), backing vocals (15)
Pino Palladino – bass (1, 5, 8, 11, 14, 15)
David Palmer – drums (2, 3, 6, 7), percussion (7)
Guy Pratt – bass (9, 13), double bass (4)
Colin Stuart – acoustic guitar (1, 5, 6, 14, 15); electric guitar (6, 11)
Jamie Talbot – tenor saxophone (6)
Philip Todd – clarinet (6)
Fiachra Trench – string and brass arrangements (1, 6, 7, 12, 15)
Steve Turner – electric guitar (7), effects (7)
Dave Woodcock – violin (1, 12)
Gavyn Wright – violin (1, 7)

Technical
Steve Lillywhite – producer
Steve Chase – engineer 
Alan Douglas – engineer 
Chris Dickie – engineer 
Colin Stuart – engineer, mixing 
Noel Harris – assistant engineer 
Roy Spong – assistant engineer 
Mark Wallis – mixing 
Heidi Cannovo – assistant mixing engineer 
Bill Smith Studio – design
Kirsty MacColl – design 
Andrew MacPherson – photography 
Bonus tracks 
Kirsty MacColl – producer ("Happy", "El Paso", "Still Life", "Please Help Me, I'm Falling", "Clubland", "Don't Run Away from Me Now", "Am I Right?")     
Colin Stuart – producer ("Happy", "El Paso", "Still Life", "Please Help Me, I'm Falling", "Clubland", "Don't Run Away from Me Now", "Am I Right?")
Johnny Marr – producer ("Happy", "El Paso")
Reissues
Steve Rooke – remastering (2005)
Chris Peyton – reissue design (2005)
Charles Dickens – inner inlay photography (2005) 
Fine Splice Ltd. – remastering (2012)
Estuary English – reissue design (2012)

Recording information
1-9, 11, 13-15 recorded at The Town House
6, 10, 12 recorded at Ealing Studios.
1, 6, 7, 12, 15 recorded at RAK Studios
David Gilmour recorded at Olympic Studios
1, 5, 10, 11, 13, 14 mixed at Ealing Studios.
2-4, 6-9, 12, 15 mixed at Olympic Studios.

Charts

References

External links
Kite at Kirsty MacColl.com

1989 albums
Kirsty MacColl albums
Albums produced by Steve Lillywhite
Virgin Records albums
Soho Square